Illalu Priyuralu is an Indian Telugu-language drama film released on 2 August 1984. The film directed by A. Kodandarami Reddy is a remake of the Bollywood film Masoom, which was adapted from the 1980 novel Man, Woman and Child by Erich Segal. The novel had two other film adaptations: the 1983 American film of the same title and the 1982 Malayalam film Olangal. Illalu Priyuralu was produced by G. Babu under Babu Arts and featured Sobhan Babu, Suhasini, Pallavi and Master Arjun in the lead roles. The film has musical score by Chakravarthy.

Cast 
 Sobhan Babu
 Suhasini
 Pallavi
 Baby Meena
 Master Arjun
 Sathyanarayana
 Sutti Veerabhadra Rao
 Sutti Velu
 Subha
 Annapurna
 Srilakshmi
 Telephone Sathyanarayana
 Dr. Madan Mohan
 Baby Seetha
 Master Prabhakar

Soundtrack
Music was composed by Chakravarthy.

References 

1980s Telugu-language films
Indian drama films
Films directed by A. Kodandarami Reddy
Films scored by K. Chakravarthy
Telugu remakes of Hindi films